Glazov may refer to:

Places
Glazov, a town in the Udmurt Republic, Russia.
Glazov Urban Okrug, a municipal formation part of the town
Glazov Glacier, Novaya Zemlya

People
Glazov (masculine) or Glazova (feminine) may also refer to:

Jamie Glazov (born 1966), managing editor of FrontPage Magazine in the United States
Eleonora Glazova, silver medalist in the 2005 International Linguistics Olympiad
Lyudmila Glazova, Soviet actress cast in The Lark, a 1964 Soviet movie
Aleksandrs Glazovs (Alexander Glazov) (born 1970), Latvian footballer
Yurij Yakovlevitch Glazov (1929-2000), also cited as J. J. Glazov, Russian indologist

See also
Glazovsky (disambiguation)